Hoarding is the gathering and storing of goods.

Hoarding may also refer to:

Animal and human behavior 

 Hoarding (animal behaviour), an animal behaviour related to storing surplus goods for later use
 Hoarding (economics), the practice of obtaining and holding resources in quantities greater than needed for one's immediate use
 Hoarding disorders
 Compulsive hoarding, a pathological hoarding by humans
 Animal hoarding, the compulsive hoarding of animals by humans

Arts, entertainment, and media 

 Hoarding: Buried Alive, an American reality television series (2010-2013) that premiered on TLC
 Hoarders (TV series), an American reality television series airing on A&E

Structures 

 Hoarding (castle), a roofed wooden shield placed over castle battlements
 Billboard, known also as a hoarding in some countries
 Temporary fencing enclosing a construction site

See also 

 Hoard (disambiguation)